The West Riding County Amateur Football League was a football competition based in Yorkshire, England. Formed in 1922, it had one division when it closed in 2019 due to a lack of participating clubs.

The Premier Division sat at level 11 of the English football league system. Silsden, Brighouse Town, Hemsworth Miners Welfare, Campion and Steeton were the most recent teams to move up from the league. Silsden were promoted in 2004 after winning the Premier Division in successive seasons but chose to play their football in the North West Counties League, as did neighbouring Steeton in 2018, whereas Brighouse Town, Hemsworth Miners Welfare and Campion went up to the Northern Counties East League.

The league operated with only one division until the 1953–54 season, then expanded over time to reach five divisions for a while.

Final member clubs
The last constitution for the 2018–19 season was as follows.  Clubs which are struck through withdrew before the end of the season.

Premier Division
AFC Bingley
Bradford Olympic
DRAM Community
Golcar United
Lepton Highlanders
Littletown
Lower Hopton
Ovenden West Riding
P.F.C. (ex West Horton)
Route One Rovers
Ryburn United
Steeton Reserves
Toller AFC
TVR United
Wakefield City

Recent divisional champions

Recent divisional cup winners

References

 
Football competitions in Yorkshire
1922 establishments in England
Sports leagues established in 1922
West Riding of Yorkshire
2019 disestablishments in England
Defunct football leagues in England